Aequipecten tehuelchus is a species of bivalves belonging to the family Pectinidae.

The species is found in Southern America. Its shell changes shape and size in three different stages throughout its lifetime: spat, juvenile, and adult.

References

Pectinidae
Bivalves described in 1842
Molluscs of South America